Metisella kambove, the Kambove sylph, is a butterfly in the family Hesperiidae. It is found in Nigeria, Cameroon, Tanzania, the Democratic Republic of the Congo and Zambia. The habitat consists of moist Brachystegia woodland.

Subspecies
Metisella kambove kambove (south-western Tanzania, Democratic Republic of the Congo: Shaba, Zambia: north-west to the Copperbelt)
Metisella kambove gamma de Jong (Nigeria, Cameroon)

References

Butterflies described in 1910
Heteropterinae